The Royal TESO N.V. is a private ferry company operating the only public boat service to and from the Dutch Wadden island of Texel. TESO stands for Texels Eigen Stoomboot Onderneming (in English: Texel's Own Steamboat Company).

Inhabitants of the island were dissatisfied with price and quality of the ferry service, as operated by the company Alkmaar Packet since 1882. In 1907 some of them formed an association, led by local physician Adriaan Wagemaker, to operate a (hired) ferry of their own. In 1908 the association was changed into a public company and islanders raised 75.000 guilders to build its first ship, which went into service in August that year. A nearly complete boycott of the services of Alkmaar Packet by the locals made that company withdraw in 1909.

3650 privately-traded shares are held by 3100 shareholders, mostly residents of Texel. In 2007, TESO celebrated its centennial anniversary, and therefore was conferred the 'Royal' designation on Texel by Queen Beatrix.

Currently, the TESO operates a fleet of two ships, both able to carry 1750 passengers and up to 300 cars. They cross the Marsdiep, a deep-tide race between Den Helder and Texel in about 20 minutes.

Ferry companies of the Netherlands
Transport companies established in 1907
Water transport in the Netherlands
Dutch companies established in 1907